Hajdú-Bihar is an administrative county (comitatus or vármegye) in eastern Hungary, on the border with Romania. It shares borders with the Hungarian counties Szabolcs-Szatmár-Bereg, Borsod-Abaúj-Zemplén, Jász-Nagykun-Szolnok and Békés. The capital of Hajdú-Bihar county is Debrecen. Together with Bihor County in Romania it constitutes the Biharia Euroregion.

Geography
The area of the county does not form a geographical unit; it shares several features with the neighbouring areas: from northeast the sand hills of the Nyírség spread over the county borders. The western part is the Hortobágy National Park ("Puszta"), a large flat area of the country. The county of Hajdú-Bihar occupies the eastern part of Hungary. Most of its territory is completely flat and is part of the Pannonian Plain region (called the Grand Plain in the country). The highest point hardly rises over 170.5 metres in the north. It seems that the county slopes to the south because the lowest point is situated in this part of Hajdú-Bihar and hits the 85 metres height.

The wind and rivers formed and shaped the land for thousands of years. First the area of the present-day Hungary was occupied by an inland sea. Then, after some underground movement, the huge peaks of the Carpathians rose from this sea. The wild and rapid rivers of the mountains slowly made that inland sea disappear. Later, the great Hungarian plain was formed by the alluvial deposits of the rivers, the wind began to work and from the great rocks became smaller and smaller sand-grains, the so-called loess. This covers thickly the Hajdú-Bihar plain as well and makes a fertile soil. There are two great rivers in this area, the Tisza and the Körös. The Hortobágy area was formed by the first one. It used to be the flood area of the Tisza river and after the river was controlled, the Hortobágy became dry, resulting in special fauna.

History
Hajdú-Bihar county was created after World War II from the pre-1938 counties Hajdú and Bihar. See the articles of those counties for the history before World War II.

Demographics

In 2015, it had a population of 537,268 and the population density was 87/km².

Ethnicity
The main minority populations in the county are Roma (about 18,000), Romanian (about 2,000), and German (about 1,000).

Total population (2011 census): 546,721
Ethnic groups (2011 census):
Hungarians: 461,809 (95.05%)
Romani: 18,132 (3.73%)
Others and indefinable: 5,936 (1.22%)
About 77,000 people in Hajdú-Bihar County did not declare their ethnicity during the 2011 census.

Religion

Religious adherence in the county according to 2011 census:

Reformed – 158,513; 
Catholic – 86,084 (Roman Catholic – 53,697; Greek Catholic – 32,359);
Evangelical – 1,086;
Orthodox – 862;
other religions – 10,330; 
Non-religious – 147,001; 
Atheism – 6,416;
Undeclared – 136,429.

Regional structure

Economy

Infrastructure
Highways no. 4, 33, 35, 42 and 47 lead to the county and the county can also be reached Hajdú-Bihar via the M3 motorway (this motorway is now a spur to Debrecen). The total length of the public roads in the county is 1,511 km. 122 road bridges span the rivers and canals. The roads cross the national borders to Romania at the cities of Ártánd and Nyírábrány.

Politics

County Assembly

The Hajdú-Bihar County Council, elected at the 2019 local government elections, is made up of 24 counselors, with the following party composition:

Presidents of the General Assembly

Members of the National Assembly
The following members elected of the National Assembly during the 2022 parliamentary election:

Municipalities
Hajdú-Bihar County has 1 urban county, 20 towns, 10 large villages and 51 villages.
Hajdú-Bihar has a comparatively small number of inhabited places: 21 towns and 61 villages. The four largest cities – both by area and by population – are Debrecen, Hajdúböszörmény, Hajdúnánás and Hajdúszoboszló.

City with county rights
(ordered by population, as of 2011 census)
Debrecen (211,320) – county seat

Towns

Hajdúböszörmény (31,725)
Hajdúszoboszló (23,933)
Balmazújváros (17,537)
Hajdúnánás (17,063)
Berettyóújfalu (15,472)
Püspökladány (14,895)
Hajdúsámson (13,121)
Hajdúhadház (12,588)
Derecske (8,922)
Nádudvar (8,853)
Hajdúdorog (8,843)
Polgár (8,098)
Nyíradony (7,585)
Létavértes (6,966)
Téglás (6,432)
Kaba (5,960)
Komádi (5,421)
Vámospércs (5,362)
Tiszacsege (4,713)
Biharkeresztes (4,149)

Villages

Álmosd
Ártánd
Bakonszeg
Bagamér 
Báránd
Bedő
Berekböszörmény
Bihardancsháza
Biharnagybajom
Bihartorda
Bocskaikert
Bojt
Csökmő 
Darvas
Ebes
Egyek 
Esztár
Folyás
Földes 
Furta
Fülöp
Gáborján
Görbeháza
Hajdúbagos
Hajdúszovát
Hencida
Hortobágy
Hosszúpályi 
Kismarja
Kokad
Konyár
Körösszakál
Körösszegapáti
Magyarhomorog
Mezőpeterd
Mezősas
Mikepércs
Monostorpályi
Nagyhegyes
Nagykereki
Nagyrábé 
Nyíracsád
Nyírábrány 
Nyírmártonfalva
Pocsaj 
Sáp
Sáránd
Sárrétudvari 
Szentpéterszeg
Szerep
Tépe
Tetétlen
Tiszagyulaháza
Told
Újiráz
Újléta
Újszentmargita
Újtikos
Váncsod
Vekerd
Zsáka 

 municipalities are large villages.

Gallery

International relations
Hajdú-Bihar County has a partnership relationship with:

References

External links
 Official site in Hungarian
 Hajdú Online (haon.hu) - The county portal
 Restaurants, bars, pubs, gastro-articles, daily menus from Hajdú-Bihar

 
Counties of Hungary